Jorge Luis Abreu Soler (born 16 March 1990) is a Venezuelan cyclist, who currently rides for Team Atlético Venezuela.

Major results

2011
 4th Road race, National Road Championships
2012
 3rd Road race, National Under-23 Road Championships
2014
 5th Time trial, National Road Championships
 5th Overall Vuelta al Táchira
 6th Overall Vuelta a Venezuela
1st Stage 4
2015
 7th Overall Vuelta al Táchira
2016
 2nd Overall Vuelta al Táchira
1st Points classification
2017
 4th Overall Vuelta Independencia Nacional
1st Mountains classification
2018
 1st Stage 5 Vuelta al Táchira
2020
 8th Overall Vuelta al Táchira
2021
 1st  Overall Vuelta a Venezuela
1st Mountains classification

References

External links

1990 births
Living people
Venezuelan male cyclists
20th-century Venezuelan people
21st-century Venezuelan people